Banasthali Niwai railway station is a railway station in Tonk district, Rajasthan. Its code is BNLW. It serves Banasthali Niwai. The station consists of 2 platforms. Passenger, Express  and Superfast trains halt here.

References

Railway stations in Tonk district
Jaipur railway division